This article contains information about the literary events and publications of 1763.

Events
January – Christopher Smart's asylum confinement ends at Mr Potter's asylum in London. (He was admitted to St Luke's Hospital for Lunatics in May 1757 and may have been confined before that; he was later moved to Potter's.) While confined, Smart has written A Song to David, published this year, and Jubilate Agno, not published until 1939.
April 30 – A warrant is issued in Britain for the arrest of John Wilkes for seditious writings in The North Briton
May 16 – James Boswell is introduced to Samuel Johnson at Thomas Davies's bookshop in Covent Garden, London.
October 11 – The marriage of Henry Thrale and Hester Thrale takes place. Both later become close friends and companions of Dr Samuel Johnson.
December 6 – John Wilkes brings a court action for trespass against Robert Wood, after the Lord Chief Justice rules that parliamentary privilege protects Wilkes from arrest for libel.
unknown dates
Fedor Emin's Nepostoyannaya fortuna, the first Russian novel, is published.
The atheist English printer John Baskerville produces an edition of The Holy Bible for Cambridge University Press in his Baskerville typeface.
probable – Chinese Qing dynasty scholar Sun Zhu compiles Three Hundred Tang Poems, an anthology of poems from the Chinese Tang dynasty (618–907).

New books

Prose
Frances Brooke – The History of Lady Julia Mandeville
James Grieve – English translation of Stepan Krasheninnikov's History of Kamtschatka
Susannah Minifie and Margaret Minifie – The Histories of Lady Frances S—— and Lady Caroline S——
John Langhorne – The Letters that Passed Between Theodosius and Constantia
Cao Xueqin – The Chronicles of the Stone

Drama
Isaac Bickerstaffe – Love in a Village (opera)
George Colman the Elder – The Deuce is in Him
Nicolás Fernandez de Moratín – Lucrecia
Samuel Foote
The Mayor of Garrett
The Trial of Samuel Foote, Esq. for a Libel on Peter Paragraph
Mary Latter – The Siege of Jerusalem
David Mallet – Elvira
Arthur Murphy – The Citizen
Frances Sheridan – The Discovery

Poetry

Richard Bentley the Younger – Patriotism
Charles Churchill
The Author
The Conference
An Epistle to William Hogarth
The Prophecy of Famine
Poems
John Collier – Tim Bobbin's Toy-shop
George Keate – The Alps
Robert Lloyd – The Death of Adam
James Macpherson (as Ossian) – Temora
William Mason – Elegies
James Merrick – Poems
Giuseppe Parini – Il giorno
Christopher Smart – A Song to David

Non-fiction
Almanach de Gotha (first issue)
John Ash – Grammatical Institutes
Thomas Bayes (died 1761) – An Essay towards solving a Problem in the Doctrine of Chances
Hugh Blair – A Critical Dissertation on the Poems of Ossian
John Brown – A Dissertation on Poetry and Music
Philip Doddridge – A Course of Lectures on the Principal Subjects in Pneumatology, Ethics, and Divinity
Immanuel Kant – The Only Possible Argument in Support of a Demonstration of the Existence of God
Antoine Simon Le Page Du Pratz – History of Louisiana; an English translation, in two volumes, of Histoire de la Louisiane, published in 1758
Catharine Macaulay – The History of England from the Accession of James I to that of the Brunswick Line
Mary Wortley Montagu – Letters
Robert Orme – A History of the Military Transactions of the British Nation in Indostan from the Year 1745
William Williams Pantycelyn – Atteb Philo-Evangelius i Martha Philopur (Philo-Evangelius's Reply to Martha Philopur)
Emanuel Swedenborg – Doctrine of Holy Scripture
Henry Venn – The Complete Duty of Man
Voltaire – Traité sur la tolérance
William Warburton – The Doctrine of Grace
John Wesley – A Survey of the Wisdom of God in the Creation

Births
January 15 – François-Joseph Talma, French actor (died 1826)
January 29 – Johann Gottfried Seume, German travel writer (died 1810)
March 9 – William Cobbett, English political and economic writer (died 1835)
March 16 – Mary Berry, English dramatist and correspondent (died 1852)
March 21 – Jean Paul (Johann Paul Friedrich Richter), German novelist (died 1825)
May 9 – János Batsányi, Hungarian poet and anti-Habsburg activist (died 1845)
June 15 – Kobayashi Issa, Japanese haiku poet (died 1828)
July 30 – Samuel Rogers, English poet (died 1855)
September 2 – Caroline Schelling (Caroline Michaelis), German literary critic (died 1809)
October 10 – Xavier de Maistre, French soldier and writer (died 1852)
December 6 – Mary Anne Burges, Scottish religious allegorist (died 1813)
Unknown dates
Huang Peilie, Chinese bibliophile (died 1825)
Shen Fu, Chinese chronicler (died c. 1825)

Deaths
January 11 – Caspar Abel, German poet and theologian (born 1676)
February 11 – William Shenstone, English poet (born 1714)
February 12 – Pierre de Marivaux, French novelist and dramatist (born 1688)
May 3 – George Psalmanazar, French-born impostor and English writer (born c. 1679)
June 29 – Hedvig Charlotta Nordenflycht, Swedish poet and salonnière (born 1718)
September 26 – John Byrom, English poet (born 1692)
December 23 – Antoine François Prévost (Abbé Prévost), French author (born 1697)
Probable year of death – Cao Xueqin, Chinese novelist (born c. 1715)

References

 
Years of the 18th century in literature